Sam Hughes (1853–1921) was a Canadian soldier and politician.

Sam, Sammy, Samuel or Samantha Hughes may also refer to:

 Sam Hughes (musician) (1824–1898), ophicleide player
 Sam Hughes (Manitoba politician) (1873–1940)
 Sam Hughes (American football) (born 1970), American football player
 Sammy T. Hughes (1910–1981), baseball player
 Samuel Hughes (judge) (1913–2002), Canadian judge, Chairman of the Hughes Inquiry
 Sam Hughes (footballer), English footballer
 Sammy Hughes (footballer) (died 2011), footballer from Northern Ireland
 Samuel C. Hughes (1829–1917), American businessman and politician
 Samuel Hughes (Quaker) (1785–1856), member of the Children of Peace and politician in Upper Canada
 Sam Hughes (fighter) (born 1992), American mixed martial artist
 Sam Hughes, also known as qntm, British programmer and science fiction author

See also
Samantha Hughes (disambiguation)
Hughes (surname)